3 Commando Brigade (3 Cdo Bde), previously called the 3rd Special Service Brigade, is a commando formation of the British Armed Forces. It is composed of the Royal Marine Commandos, alongside commando qualified sailors, soldiers and airmen from the British Army, Royal Navy and Royal Air Force.

The brigade was formed on 14 February 1942, during the Second World War, with a mixture of Army Commando and Royal Marine Commando units, and was deployed to the South-East Asian Theatre of World War II to conduct operations against the invading forces of Imperial Japan, such as the Burma Campaign. After the Second World War, the Army Commandos were disbanded and the brigade became a Royal Marine formation. Recently, 3 Commando Brigade has again become a mixed formation with the addition of commando qualified soldiers from the Royal Artillery and Royal Engineers to provide support for the Royal Marine Commandos. Since the end of the Second World War, it has been involved in a number of engagements such as the Suez Crisis, Falklands War, Gulf War and the War in Afghanistan.

History

Second World War
Between September and November 1943, in Scotland, 102nd Brigade, Royal Marines Division, was detached from the division, to form the independent 3rd Special Service Brigade – a joint British Army-Royal Marines formation. The founding commander was Brigadier Wilfrid Nonweiler and it was composed of the following units:
 No. 1 Commando (British Army);
 No. 5 Commando (British Army);
 No. 42 Commando (Royal Marines), and;
 No. 44 Commando (Royal Marines).
Nos. 1 and 5 Commandos had already earned battle honours as units in, respectively, the North African and Madagascar campaigns. Because "Commando", at the time, implied a company/battalion-sized unit, the name "Special Service" was instead used for British commando brigades. (However, the term "Commando Brigade" was often used informally, because "Special Service" was unpopular and had a superficial similarity to the name of the notorious German Schutzstaffel (SS). The brigade was later officially renamed 3rd Commando Brigade.

On 10 November 1943, elements of the brigade embarked at Gourock, bound for India. It was intended that the brigade would be used in operations against Japanese forces in the South-East Asia theatre, such as the Burma campaign. However, the limited shipping capacity available at the time meant that the relocation was prolonged and the components of the brigade were not reunited until late 1944. Lt Col. Peter Young was transferred from the Normandy campaign to become 2IC of 3rd Commando Brigade. Young succeeded Nonweiler as commander of the brigade.

During January 1945, the brigade was involved in the campaign to recapture Arakan, including the battles of Myebon peninsula and Kangaw. The brigade was then withdrawn to India to prepare for Operation Zipper, a proposed amphibious operation to recapture the Malayan peninsula. The atomic bombs against Japan precipitated an earlier surrender of Japan than expected. The 3rd Commando Brigade moved to secure Hong Kong – a British crown colony that was under Japanese occupation in 1941–45. During 1946, British Army personnel and units within the 3rd Commando Brigade were demobilised or transferred elsewhere and it became a Royal Marine formation.

Post Second World War
3 Commando Brigade's most high-profile operation after the war was the Suez Crisis, when it took part in the amphibious assault against Egyptian targets. During Operation Musketeer, units of the brigade made a helicopter-borne assault.
 
1971 saw the withdrawal of British forces from the Far East and Persian Gulf. The brigade returned to the UK with other British units. It moved to Stonehouse Barracks in Plymouth, where it remains to this day.

Operation Corporate
The brigade's next large operation was in 1982. Argentina invaded the Falkland Islands, and 3 Commando Brigade, reinforced by 2 Para and 3 Para, was one of the two main British land formations that took part in operations to recapture the islands. The brigade landed at San Carlos Water and marched across East Falkland to Stanley. Argentine units were defeated in several sharp engagements, and their forces surrendered on 14 June.

Gulf War
In the aftermath of the 1991 Gulf War, the brigade was deployed on a non-combat task in northern Iraq. The Iraqi Kurds had suffered immensely during the war and in its aftermath, and the brigade was used due to its rapid deployment ability. It provided humanitarian aid to the Kurds and saved many from starvation.

21st century

Recently, the brigade has been involved in two major campaigns, including Operation Veritas in Afghanistan, 2001 and 2002, and Operation Telic during the 2003 invasion of Iraq. Iraq, however, saw heavy fighting occur in the early stages of the campaign, as the brigade made its first amphibious assault in over 20 years by landing on the Al-Faw peninsula in south-east Iraq. In 2006, the brigade returned to Afghanistan on Operation Herrick, replacing 16 Air Assault Brigade, where intense fighting occurred.

Organisation

The brigade contains Royal Marines, Royal Navy, Army and Royal Air Force personnel. The subordinate units are:

Joint Terminal Attack Controllers from the RAF Regiment are assigned to Brigade HQ. When operating as part of the combined United Kingdom / Netherlands Landing Force, the 1st Marine Combat Group of the Dutch Korps Mariniers is also attached to the brigade.

Commanders
Commanders have included:

1944 Brigadier Peter Young
1944–1945 Brigadier Campbell Hardy
1948–1951 Brigadier Campbell Hardy
1951–1952 Brigadier Cecil Phillips
1952–1954 Brigadier James Moulton
1954–1955 Brigadier Ian Riches
1955–1957 Brigadier Reginald Madoc
1957–1959 Brigadier Robert Houghton
1959–1960 Brigadier Peter Hellings
1960–1962 Brigadier Norman Tailyour
1962–1964 Brigadier Francis Barton
1964–1965 Brigadier Leslie Marsh
1965–1966 Brigadier Anthony Willasey-Wilsey
1966–1968 Brigadier Ian Gourlay
1968–1970 Brigadier Peter Whiteley
1970–1972 Brigadier Patrick Ovens
1972–1975 Brigadier Roger Ephraums
1975–1977 Brigadier John Richards
1977–1979 Brigadier Jeremy Moore
1979–1981 Brigadier Michael Wilkins
1981–1983 Brigadier Julian Thompson
1983–1984 Brigadier Martin Garrod
1984–1986 Brigadier Henry Beverley
1986–1988 Brigadier Robin Ross
1988–1990 Brigadier Andrew Whitehead
1990–1992 Brigadier Andrew Keeling
1992–1994 Brigadier David Pennefather
1994–1995 Brigadier Jonathan Thomson
1995–1997 Brigadier Anthony Milton
1997–1998 Brigadier Robert Fulton
1998–1999 Brigadier David Wilson
1999–2001 Brigadier Robert Fry
2001–2002 Brigadier Roger Lane
2002–2004 Brigadier James Dutton
2004–2006 Brigadier John Rose
2006–2007 Brigadier Jeremy Thomas
2007–2008 Brigadier David Capewell
2008–2008 Brigadier Buster Howes
2008–2009 Brigadier Gordon Messenger
2010–2011 Brigadier Ed Davis
2011–2013 Brigadier Martin Smith
2013–2014 Brigadier Stuart M. Birrell
2014–2015 Brigadier Charles Stickland
2015–2017 Brigadier Jim Morris
2017–2018 Brigadier Gwyn Jenkins
2018–2020 Brigadier Matt Jackson
2020– Brigadier Richard Cantrill.

Battle honours
The following Battle honours were awarded to the British Commandos during the Second World War.

 Vaagso
 Norway 1941
 St. Nazaire
 Dieppe
 Normandy Landing
 Dives Crossing
 Flushing
 Westkapelle
 Rhine
 Leese
 Aller
 North-West Europe 1942 '44–45
 Litani
 Syria 1941
 Steamroller Farm
 Sedjenane 1
 Djebel Choucha
 North Africa 1941–43
 Landing in Sicily
 Pursuit to Messina
 Sicily 1943
 Landing at Porto San Venere
 Termoli
 Salerno
 Monte Ornito
 Anzio
 Valli di Comacchio
 Argenta Gap
 Italy 1943–45
 Greece 1944–45
 Crete
 Madagascar
 Adriatic
 Middle East 1941 '42 '44
 Alethangyaw
 Myebon
 Kangaw
 Burma 1943–45

See also
 1st Commando Brigade
 2nd Special Service Brigade
 4th Special Service Brigade
 Australian commandos
 British Armed Forces
 Commandos (United Kingdom)
 Marine expeditionary brigade – American equivalent
 Military history of Britain
 Netherlands Marine Corps – Dutch equivalent and part of UK/NL Landing Force
 Ski warfare

References

Citations

Sources

External links

 
 

Royal Marine formations and units
Amphibious landing brigades
Military units and formations established in 1942
Military units and formations of the United Kingdom in the Falklands War
Military units and formations of the United Kingdom in the War in Afghanistan (2001–2021)
Commando units and formations of the United Kingdom
Military units and formations of the Iraq War
The Rifles
1942 establishments in the United Kingdom
N